Walter Thomas Huston (April 5, 1883 – April 7, 1950) was a Canadian actor and singer. Huston won the Academy Award for Best Supporting Actor for his role in The Treasure of the Sierra Madre, directed by his son John Huston. He is the patriarch of the four generations of the Huston acting family, including his son John, grandchildren Anjelica Huston and Danny Huston, as well as great-grandchild Jack Huston. The family has produced three generations of Academy Award winners: Walter, his son John, and granddaughter Anjelica.

Early life
Huston was born on April 5, 1883, in Toronto, Ontario, where he attended Winchester Street Public School. He was the son of Elizabeth (née McGibbon) and Robert Moore Huston, a farmer who founded a construction company. He was of Scottish and Irish descent. He had a brother and two sisters, one of whom was the theatrical voice coach Margaret Carrington (1877–1941).

His family moved, before his birth, from Melville, just south of Orangeville, Ontario, where they were farmers. As a young man, he worked in construction and in his spare time attended the Shaw School of Acting. He made his stage debut in 1902. He went on to tour in In Convict Stripes, a play by Hal Reid, father of Wallace Reid and also appeared with Richard Mansfield in Julius Caesar. He again toured in another play The Sign of the Cross. In 1904, he married Rhea Gore (1882–1938) and gave up acting to work as a manager of electric power stations in Nevada, Missouri. He maintained these jobs until 1909.

Career
 

In 1909, with his marriage foundering, he appeared with an older actress named Bayonne Whipple (born Mina Rose, 1865–1937). They were billed as Whipple and Huston and, in 1915, they married. Vaudeville was their livelihood into the 1920s.

Huston began his Broadway career on January 22, 1924, when he performed there in the play Mr. Pitt. He then solidified his Broadway career with roles in productions such as Desire Under the Elms, Kongo, The Barker, and Elmer the Great.

Once talkies began in Hollywood, he was cast in both character roles and as a leading man. His first major role was portraying the villainous Trampas in The Virginian (1929), a Western that costars Gary Cooper and Richard Arlen. Some of Huston's other early sound roles include Abraham Lincoln (1930), Rain (1932), and Gabriel Over the White House (1933).

Huston remained busy on stage and screen throughout the 1930s and 1940s, becoming during that period one of America's most prominent actors. He starred as the title character in the 1934 Broadway adaptation of Sinclair Lewis's novel Dodsworth as well as in the play's film version released two years later. For his role as Sam Dodsworth, Huston won the New York Film Critics Circle Award for Best Actor and was Oscar nominated. He performed "September Song" in the original Broadway production of Knickerbocker Holiday (1938). Huston's recording of "September Song" is heard repeatedly in September Affair (1950).

Huston makes an uncredited appearance in the 1941 film noir classic The Maltese Falcon, portraying the ship's captain who is shot just before delivering the black bird to Sam Spade, played by Humphrey Bogart. Walter's son, John Huston, directed the picture. As a practical joke during filming, John had his father enter the scene and die in more than 10 different takes.

Among several of his contributions to World War II Allied propaganda films, Huston in an uncredited role portrays a military instructor in the short Safeguarding Military Information (1942). That film was produced by the Academy of Motion Picture Arts and Sciences and distributed by the War Activities Committee of the Motion Pictures Industry. He, along with Anthony Veiller, is also a narrator in the Why We Fight series of World War II documentaries directed by Frank Capra. Other films of this period in which he appears are The Devil and Daniel Webster (1941) as Mr. Scratch, Yankee Doodle Dandy (1942), and Mission to Moscow (1943). In the latter feature, a pro-Soviet World War II propaganda film, he plays United States Ambassador Joseph E. Davies.

Huston portrays the character Howard in the 1948 adventure drama The Treasure of the Sierra Madre, which was also directed by his son John. Based on the mysterious B. Traven's novel, the film depicts the story of three gold prospectors in 1920s post-revolution Mexico. Walter Huston won the Golden Globe Award and the Academy Award for Best Supporting Actor for the film, while John Huston won the Best Director Academy Award, thus making them the first father and son to win at the same ceremony. His last film is The Furies (1950) in which he costars with Barbara Stanwyck and Wendell Corey. In that Western, Huston's final line is "There will never be another one like me."

Death
On April 7, 1950, Huston died of an aortic aneurysm in his hotel suite in Beverly Hills, two days after his 67th birthday. He was cremated.

Legacy
In 1960, a decade after his death, Huston received a star on the Hollywood Walk of Fame at 6624 Hollywood Boulevard, memorializing his contributions to the entertainment industry through his extensive, critically acclaimed work in motion pictures. He was also a member of the American Theater Hall of Fame.

Huston's son John initially became a screenwriter before becoming an Academy Award-winning director and acclaimed actor. All of Huston's grandchildren, except Tony Huston, have become actors, as well as his great-grandson. Granddaughter Anjelica sang "September Song" on the May 7, 2012, episode of the NBC TV series Smash.

In 1998, Scarecrow Press published John Weld's September Song—An Intimate Biography of Walter Huston.

Filmography

See also

Canadian pioneers in early Hollywood
List of actors with Academy Award nominations

References

Further reading

External links

 
 

1883 births
1950 deaths
20th-century American male actors
20th-century Canadian male actors
American male film actors
American male stage actors
Best Supporting Actor Academy Award winners
Best Supporting Actor Golden Globe (film) winners
Burials in California
Canadian emigrants to the United States
Canadian expatriate male actors in the United States
Canadian male film actors
Canadian male stage actors
Canadian people of Irish descent
Canadian people of Scottish descent
Deaths from aortic aneurysm
People from Old Toronto
Walter
People from Orangeville, Ontario
Vaudeville performers